FK Vardar Negotino is a football club from Negotino, North Macedonia. They are currently competing in the Macedonian Second League.

History
The club was founded in 1938.

Supporters

FK Vardar Negotino supporters were called Vinari (Vintners). Vinarite are good friends with Komiti Skopje. When support Vardar Vinari use 2 trumpets and 1 drum.

References

External links
Club info at MacedonianFootball 
Football Federation of Macedonia Website 

Vardar Negotino
Association football clubs established in 1938
1938 establishments in Yugoslavia
FK